Graham Jones (birth unknown) is a Welsh former professional rugby league footballer who played in the 1950s.

International honours
Graham Jones won a cap for Wales while at Salford in 1959.

References

Living people
Place of birth missing (living people)
Rugby league five-eighths
Salford Red Devils players
Wales national rugby league team players
Welsh rugby league players
Year of birth missing (living people)